Mike Small (born March 4, 1966) is an American professional golfer and college golf coach.

Amateur career
Small was born in Aurora, Illinois and grew up in Danville, Illinois. He was a four-time letter winner at Danville High School. He won the Junior Masters in 1984 and went on to play college golf at the University of Illinois. At Illinois, he was a member of the 1988 Big Ten Championship team, where he finished second behind teammate and current PGA Tour member Steve Stricker. Small was named to the All-Big Ten squad and won two tournaments during his senior year, the Butler National Intercollegiate and the Michigan State Spartan Classic.

Professional career
Small turned professional in 1990 and played on various tours before joining the PGA Tour in 1995. In 1997, he won two Nike Tour (now Korn Ferry Tour) events and finished in the top 15 on the Nike Tour money list, earning his PGA Tour card for the 1998 season.  He played on the PGA Tour in 1998, where his best finish was 9th place at the Bell Canadian Open. In 2003, Small won the Illinois PGA and Illinois Open titles, becoming the first golfer ever to win both tournaments in the same year. He would repeat that feat three more times on the way to winning twelve IPGA titles and four Illinois Opens.  He has played in 96 Nationwide Tour events finishing in the top-10 eight times. Small has also won the PGA Professional National Championship thrice, in 2005, in 2009, and in 2010. He has played in over 50 PGA Tour events in his career, including thirteen major championships. In 2016, he turned 50 and qualified for his first senior major championship, finishing T-43 at the U.S. Senior Open.  He has also finished as the low club professional in the PGA Championship in 2007 and 2011.

Small has been the head golf coach at the University of Illinois since 2000. He was Big Ten Coach of the Year for the 2001-02 season, when Illinois placed 18th in the NCAA Championships. He won the honor again for the 2008-09 season when Illinois won their first Big Ten title in 21 years. He led the Illini to the Big Ten championship in each of the next four seasons, again winning conference coach of the year honors each year. In addition, he has been named Midwest Coach of the Year by the Golf Coaches Association five times, in 2003, 2009, 2010, 2011 and 2013. His 2013 Illini team won the school's first-ever NCAA Regional championship, and finished second in the NCAA Finals after defeating defending champion Texas and #1-ranked California in match play. It marks Illinois' best finish in school history.

On October 25, 2013, Small was inducted into the Illinois Golf Hall of Fame.

Personal life
Small's father, Bill Small, was captain of the 1963 Big Ten Champion Illinois Fighting Illini men's basketball team and earned All Big-Ten honors. Small's brother, Andy, was a member of the 1990 Big Ten Champion Illinois baseball squad and won four varsity letters as an infielder.

Amateur wins
1984 Junior Masters
1987 Butler National Intercollegiate, Michigan State Spartan Classic

Professional wins (22)

Nike Tour wins (2)

Other wins (23)
2001 Illinois PGA Championship
2003 Illinois PGA Championship, Illinois Open Championship
2004 Illinois PGA Championship
2005 Illinois PGA Championship, Illinois Open Championship, PGA Club Professional Championship
2006 Illinois PGA Championship, Illinois Open Championship
2007 Illinois PGA Championship, Illinois Open Championship, Illinois PGA Match Play Championship
2008 Illinois PGA Championship
2009 Illinois PGA Championship, PGA Professional National Championship
2010 Illinois PGA Championship, PGA Professional National Championship
2013 Illinois PGA Championship
2014 Illinois PGA Championship
2016 Illinois PGA Championship
2017 Illinois Senior PGA Championship
2018 Illinois Senior PGA Championship
2019 Illinois Senior PGA Championship

Results in major championships

CUT = missed the half-way cut
"T" = tied
Note: Small never played in the Masters Tournament or The Open Championship.

U.S. national team appearances
PGA Cup: 2005, 2007 (winners), 2009 (winners), 2011 (winners), 2013 (tie)

See also
1997 Nike Tour graduates

External links
Profile on Illinois' official athletic site

American male golfers
Illinois Fighting Illini men's golfers
PGA Tour golfers
College golf coaches in the United States
Korn Ferry Tour graduates
Golfers from Illinois
Illinois Fighting Illini men's golf coaches
Gies College of Business alumni
People from Danville, Illinois
1966 births
Living people